The 1900 Arkansas Cardinals football team represented the University of Arkansas during the 1900 college football season. The Razorbacks played two intercollegiate football games and two games against high school teams.  They compiled a 2–1–1 record (1–1 excluding high school games) and outscored their opponents by a combined total of 36 to 23.

Colbert Searles was the team's football coach in 1899 and 1900. He was a graduate of Wesleyan University and a professor of romance languages. In the summer of 1901, he left the University of Arkansas to accept a position as a professor at Stanford University.

Schedule

References

Arkansas
Arkansas Razorbacks football seasons
Arkansas Cardinals football